Coon Creek is a stream in the U.S. state of Missouri. It is a tributary of Perche Creek.

Coon Creek was named for the raccoons encountered by pioneers in the area.

See also
List of rivers of Missouri

References

Rivers of Boone County, Missouri
Rivers of Howard County, Missouri
Rivers of Missouri